Anıtlı is a village in the Midyat District of Mardin Province in Turkey. It is located in the historical region of Tur Abdin.

In the village, there are churches of Mor Sobo and of Yoldath Aloho.

History

Ḥāḥ (today called Anıtlı) is identified as the settlement of Khabkhi. The Assyrian king Ashurnasirpal II extracted tribute of cattle, sheep, wine, cooking-pots, tubs, and bronze armour from the land of Khabkhi during his campaign against Nairi in 879 BC. Zazabukha was located in the territory of Khabkhi.

The Syriac Orthodox patriarch and historian Michael the Syrian named Iyawannis Musa, bishop of Ḥāḥ, as a former student of the Mor Hananyo Monastery in his Chronicle. Sarjis Qar'uni was metropolitan bishop of Ḥāḥ from 1484 to his death in 1508.

The mayor of Ḥāḥ was assassinated by Islamic extremists on 29 November 1993.

Demography
The village had a population of 148 in 2021. It is populated by Assyrians who belong to the Syriac Orthodox Church. They traditionally spoke Kurdish but Turoyo language has since become more prominent amongst young people. A number of villagers emigrated abroad to Germany and France in the late 20th century.

The following is a list of the number of Assyrian families that have inhabited Ḥāḥ per year stated. Unless otherwise stated, all figures are from the list provided in Eastern Christianity, Theological Reflection on Religion, Culture, and Politics in the Holy Land and Christian Encounter with Islam and the Muslim World, as noted in the bibliography below.

1966: 73
1978: 67
1979: 55
1981: 52
1987: 42
1995: 19
1997: 18
2013: 17–18

References
Notes

Citations

Bibliography

Villages in Midyat District
Assyrian communities in Turkey
Tur Abdin